A Collector's Edition is a common name of a Special edition or Collector's edition

Collector's Edition may also refer to:
 Limited Collectors' Edition, a comic book series published by DC Comics in the 1970s
Children of the Corn: The Collector's Edition
Collector's Edition (Antique album)
Poison – Box Set (Collector's Edition)
Sinatra: Collector's Edition 2009
Collector's Edition No. 1 debut EP by L.A. Guns
Carly Simon Collector's Edition 
Limited Collector's Edition, an album by Glen Campbell